Mian Hussain (born July 10, 1990 in Laval, Quebec) is a Canadian boxer who represented Canada at the 2011 Pan American Games as a welterweight.  Hussain is now a professional boxer with a record of 16 wins (6 by KO), with only 2 defeats.

References 

1990 births
Living people
Canadian male boxers
Canadian sportspeople of Pakistani descent
Boxers at the 2011 Pan American Games
Pan American Games bronze medalists for Canada
Sportspeople from Laval, Quebec
Welterweight boxers
Pan American Games medalists in boxing
Medalists at the 2011 Pan American Games
20th-century Canadian people
21st-century Canadian people